The following is a list of National Collegiate Athletic Association (NCAA) Division I college soccer teams that have qualified for the NCAA Division I Men's Soccer Championship as of the end of the 2021 season, with teams listed by number of appearances. From 1959 through 1971, the NCAA had only one division for soccer, until the Division II tournament was started in 1972, with Division III following in 1974.

Active programs
All programs are listed by their current athletic brand names, which do not always correspond with the program's branding in a given season.

Former programs

† = Appearance vacated by the NCAA.

See also
 NCAA Men's Division II Soccer Tournament appearances by school

Footnotes

References

appearances